Yael S. Feldman (Hebrew: יעל פלדמן, née Keren-Or, born 1941) is an Israeli-born American scholar and academic particularly known for her work in comparative literature and feminist Hebrew literary criticism.

She is the Abraham I. Katsh Professor Emerita of Hebrew Culture and Education in the Judaic Studies Department at New York University and an affiliated professor of Comparative Literature and Gender Studies. She is also a fellow of the American Academy for Jewish Research, and a visiting fellow at Wolfson College, Cambridge. Feldman has lectured and published internationally, and served as editor of both general and academic journals. Her research interests include Hebrew culture (biblical and modern); history of ideas (particularly of Zionism and its contexts); gender and cultural studies; and psychoanalytic criticism.

Biography 
Feldman received her B.A. in Hebrew literature and language and
English literature from Tel Aviv University in 1967 and her M.A. in medieval
Hebrew literature from Hebrew College in 1976. Her Ph.D. dissertation at
Columbia University was on the Hebrew-American poet Gabriel Preil who
was to become the subject of her first book, Modernism and Cultural Transfer:
Gabriel Preil and the Tradition of Jewish Literary Bilingualism (1986). Her
MA thesis formed the basis of her second book, in Hebrew, Polarity and Parallel: Semantic Patterns in the Medieval Hebrew Qasida (1987). After receiving her Ph.D. in 1981, she completed postdoctoral study at the Columbia University Center for Psychoanalytic Training and Research. Psychoanalytic theory has continued to inform her literary criticism as well as her studies on gender and biblical and Zionist
narratives, beginning with her third publication, Teaching the Hebrew Bible as Literature in Translation (1989) and subsequent articles. According to Glenda Abramson, writing in The Oxford Handbook of Jewish Studies, by the 1980s Feldman was seen as one of the leaders of the study of Israeli literary feminism along with Anne Golomb Hoffman and Naomi Sokoloff. Her No Room of Their Own: Gender and Nation in Israeli Women's Fiction, published in 1999, was the first book-length treatment devoted to Israeli women writers and written from a feminist perspective, especially the work of Virginia Woolf and Simon de Beauvoir.  It was a finalist in the 2000 National Jewish Book Awards and its 2003 Hebrew translation,  ללא חדר משלהן: מגדר ולאומיות ביצירתן של סופרות ישראליות: שולמית לפיד, עמליה כהנא-כרמון, שולמית הראבן, נתיבה בן-יהודה, רות אלמוג won the Abraham Friedman Award for Hebrew Literature. Her fifth book, Glory and Agony: Isaac's Sacrifice and National Narrative, is the first book-length study of the ethos of national sacrifice in modern Hebrew culture. Growing out of her abiding interest in the impact of the Bible on contemporary psycho-politics, gender, and violence, it explores the biblical and classical stories of potential and enacted sacrifice (Isaac, Jephthah’s daughter, Iphigenia, Jesus) that have nourished myths of altruist heroism over the last century. This study was a finalist in the 2010 National Jewish Book Awards (Scholarship–Nahum M. Sarna Memorial Award). It was described by Perry Meisel as  “a dazzling synthesis of political and religious history, particularly the history of the State of Israel and the tradition of Biblical interpretation" and as an "essential reading for American readers" by Alicia Ostriker. Glory and Agony has been praised in Review of Biblical Literature, where Lena-Sofia Tiemeyer wrote "This fascinating, multifaceted, and erudite book... is both very enjoyable and highly thought provoking, and I can recommend it whole-heartedly."

Grants and awards
Feldman’s scholarship—twice a Finalist in the National Jewish Book Awards and the winner of the Abraham Friedman Award for Hebrew Literature-was supported by various grants and fellowships, including the National Endowment for the Humanities, Fulbright-Hays Program, Littauer Foundation, Centers for Advanced Jewish Studies at Oxford and PENN Universities, Lady Davis Fellowship at the Hebrew University of Jerusalem, and Yad Vashem International Holocaust Research Center.

Editorial and other professional activities
Feldman served for 17 years (1985–2002) as the Culture and Art Editor of Ha-do'ar, an American Hebrew Journal of long standing (1921–2005). She has also served on the editorial boards of the academic journals Prooftexts, Hebrew Studies,  Contemporary Women's Writings, and Women in Judaism. In 1992 she founded the Discussion Group for Modern Hebrew Literature at the Modern Language Association of America and served as its first Chair.

Selected publications

Articles
The following is a selection of the more than 90 refereed journal articles and book chapters authored by Yael Feldman.
“The Romantic Hebraism of Gabriel Preil.” Prooftexts: a Journal of Jewish Literary History.  Vol. 2, No. 2, May 1982, pp. 147–162.
"The Latent and the Manifest: Freudianism in A Guest for the Night". Prooftexts: a Journal of Jewish Literary History (Indiana University Press), Vol. 7, No. 1, Special Issue on S. Y. Agnon, January 1987, pp. 29–39
"Zionism: Neurosis or Cure? The "Historical" Drama of Yehoshua Sobol", Prooftexts: a Journal of Jewish Literary History (Indiana University Press), Vol. 7, No. 2, May 1987, pp. 145-162
"The Invention of Hebrew Prose: Modern Fiction and the Language of Realism" by Robert Alter. Modern Fiction Studies (The Johns Hopkins University Press), Vol. 36, No. 4, Winter 1990, pp. 692–693
"Whose Story Is It, Anyway? Ideology and Psychology in the Representation of the Shoah in Israeli Literature" in Saul Friedländer (ed.), Probing the Limits of Representation: Nazism and the "Final Solution". Harvard University Press, 1992, pp. 223–239. 
"Feminism under Siege: Israeli Women Writers" in Judith Reesa Baskin (ed.), Women of the Word: Jewish Women and Jewish Writing. Wayne State University Press, 1994, pp. 323–342. 
"Postcolonial Memory, Postmodern Intertextuality: Anton Shammas's Arabesques Revisited". PMLA, Vol. 114, No. 3 (May, 1999), pp. 373–389
"From "The Madwoman in the Attic" to "The Women's Room": The American Roots of Israeli Feminism". Israel Studies,  Vol. 5, No. 1, The Americanization of Israel, Spring 2000, pp. 266–286
"From Essentialism to Constructivism? The Gender of Peace and War in Gilman, Woolf, Freud". Partial Answers: A Journal of Literature and History of Ideas, January 2004, pp. 113–145.
"On the Cusp of Christianity: Virgin Sacrifice in Pseudo-Philo and Amos Oz". The Jewish Quarterly Review, Vol. 97,  No. 3, Summer 2007, pp. 379–415.
"Deconstructing the Biblical Sources in Israeli Theater: Yisurei Iyov by Hanoch Levin". AJS Review, 1987, 12, pp 251–277
"The Land of Issac? From 'Glory of Akedah' to 'Issac's Fear'". Shma: A Journal of Jewish Ideas, September 2011, pp. 16–17.
"Between Genesis and Sophocles: Biblical Psycho-politics in A. B. Yehoshua's Mr. Mani," History and Literature: New Readings of Jewish Texts in honor of Arnold Band, eds. William Cutter and David Jacobson, Brown UP, 2002, 451-464.
"On the Cusp of Christianity: Virgin Sacrifice in Pseudo-Philo and Amos Oz." JQR, 97: 3 (Summer 2007): 379-415.
"’Not as Sheep Led to Slaughter’?: On Trauma, Selective Memory, and the Making of Historical Consciousness" Jewish Social Studies (2013), 139-169.  
"Deliverance Denied: Isaac’s Sacrifice in Israeli Arts and Culture - a Jewish-Christian Exchange?" The Bible Retold, eds. Leneman and Walfish (2015), 85-117.
"‘Flavius on Trial in Mandate Palestine, 1932-1945," in Josephus in Modern Jewish Culture, ed. Andrea Schatz; Giuseppe Veltri's series, Studies in Jewish History and Culture, Brill (2019), 309-329.                                       
"Women, Blacks, Jews: Overcoming Otherness -- the Impact of Beauvoir, Sartre, and Fanon on Israeli Gender Discourse," in Sartre, Jews, and the Other, Vidal Sassoon Studies in Antisemitism, Racism, and Prejudice, Vol. I, Manuela Consonni and Vivian Liska, eds., de Gruyter (2020), 252-270.

Books
Modernism and Cultural Transfer: Gabriel Preil and the Tradition of Jewish Literary Bilingualism. (Cincinnati: Hebrew Union College Press 1986) 

Polarity and Parallel: Semantic Patterns in the Medieval Hebrew Qasida (published in Hebrew as      בין הקטבים לקו המשווה : שירת ימי־הביניים : תבניות סמאנטיות בשיר המורכב). Tel Aviv: Papyrus, 1987
 Teaching the Hebrew Bible as Literature in Translation, co-editor. New York: MLA Publications, 1989. 
No Room of Their Own: Gender and Nation in Israeli Women's Fiction. New York: Columbia University Press, 1999. 

A National Jewish Book Award Finalist, 1999 [category: Women Studies].

 Published in Hebrew [translation by Michal Sapir] as                                                                                 ללא חדר משלהן: מגדר ולאומיות ביצירתן של סופרות ישראליות:  עמליה כהנא כרמון,שולמית הראבן, שולמית לפיד, רות אלמוג, נתיבה בן-יהודה.
[Lelo heder mishelahen: Migdar uleumiut biyetziratan shel sofrot israeliyot, Tel Aviv: Hakibbutz Hameuhad, 2002]

Abraham Friedman Memorial Prize, 2003

Glory and Agony: Isaac's Sacrifice and National Narrative. Stanford UP, California: Stanford University Press, 2010. 

A National Jewish Book Award Finalist, 2010   [category: Scholarship]

References

External links
 Yael S. Feldman. "A Future With No Perhaps". New York Times, August 10, 1986
Articles by Yael S. Feldman  in Jewish Women: A Comprehensive Historical Encyclopedia
Yael S. Feldman on WorldCat
Yael Feldman on Secularjewishculture.org Bookshelf section.

New York University faculty
Israeli literary critics
Israeli women literary critics
Gender studies academics
Cultural historians
Columbia University alumni
Tel Aviv University alumni
Living people
American literary critics
American women literary critics
Year of birth missing (living people)